Atomic Lobster is the tenth novel by Tim Dorsey. It was released January 27, 2008.  It follows overly zealous serial killer Serge A. Storms.

2008 American novels
Novels by Tim Dorsey

William Morrow and Company books